Ground Floor is an American sitcom created by Bill Lawrence and Greg Malins, that aired on TBS for two seasons, from November 14, 2013, through February 10, 2015. The series stars Skylar Astin, Briga Heelan, Rory Scovel and John C. McGinley and followed Brody, a successful banker who falls for Jenny, an intelligent maintenance supervisor who works in the same building.

Following earlier reports, the show was cancelled on February 13, 2015, despite positive reviews.

Synopsis
Ground Floor follows Brody (Skylar Astin), a young and successful banker at Remington Trust, who after a one-night stand with Jenny (Briga Heelan) discovers that she works in maintenance for his building. From there, they deal with their growing feelings for each other, much to the annoyance of their co-workers, while trying to find a balance between their vastly different work environments.

Cast

 Skylar Astin as Brody Carol Moyer
 Briga Heelan as Jenny Miller
 Rory Scovel as Mark "Harvard" Shrake
 Rene Gube as Mike "Threepeat" Wen
 James Earl as Derrick Dupree
 Alexis Knapp as Tori (season 1)
 John C. McGinley as Remington Stewart Mansfield
 Emily Heller as Lindsay Harris (season 2)

Recurring
 Anna Camp as Heather

Development and production
TBS ordered a pilot for Ground Floor on February 21, 2013. The series was created by Bill Lawrence and Greg Malins, with Lawrence serving as executive producer alongside Jeff Astrof and Jeff Ingold, and the production companies Warner Bros. Television and Doozer.

Casting began in February 2013, with John C. McGinley cast as Mr. Mansfield, the boss. Skylar Astin and Briga Heelan then joined the cast in the two lead roles, with Astin playing Brody, a Harvard graduate and money manager who falls for Heelan's Jennifer, an intelligent maintenance worker. The next to be cast were Rene Gube and James Earl, with Gube in the role of Threepeat, a money manager, and Earl playing Derrick, a laid-back guy who works with Jennifer on the ground floor. Rory Scovel joined the series as "Harvard", a classic know-it-all who harbors an overt crush on his ground-floor co-worker Jennifer. Alexis Knapp was the final actor cast, appearing in the first season as Tori, a sexy co-worker of Jennifer's who hits the clubs at night and catches up on her sleep at work. Knapp and Astin had previously worked together in the comedy Pitch Perfect.

On May 10, 2013, TBS placed a series order on Ground Floor, which premiered on November 14, 2013.

On March 6, 2014, Ground Floor was renewed for a second season, which premiered December 9, 2014 and consisted of ten episodes.

Series overview

Episodes

Season 1 (2013–14)

Season 2 (2014–15)

Ratings

Prior to its second season renewal, the first season averaged 1.8 million viewers in Live + 7 delivery, including 1.1 million adults 18-49 and 575,000 adults 18–34.

References

External links
 

2010s American sitcoms
2010s American workplace comedy television series
2013 American television series debuts
2015 American television series endings
English-language television shows
TBS (American TV channel) original programming
Television series by Warner Horizon Television
Television shows set in San Francisco
Television series created by Bill Lawrence (TV producer)